Ramesh Pokhriyal "Nishank" (born 15 July 1959), is an Indian politician who was appointed on 31 May 2019 to serve as Minister of Human Resource Development and as of July 2020, following the ministry's name change, his title was changed to Minister of Education.

He represents the Haridwar Parliamentary constituency of Uttarakhand in the 17th Lok Sabha.

He was the 5th Chief Minister of Uttarakhand from 2009 to 2011. He was member of the 16th Lok Sabha and chairperson, Committee on Government Assurances.

Personal life 
Pokhriyal was born in Pinani village, Pauri Garhwal, Uttarakhand to Paramanand Pokhriyal and Vishambhari Devi. He received an M.A. degree from Hemwati Nandan Bahuguna Garhwal University.

Pokhriyal married Kusum Kanta Pokhriyal on 7 May 1985, with whom he has three daughters. One of their daughters, Aarushi Nishank is a classical dancer. His wife died on 11 November 2012 in Dehradun at the age of 50.

Political career

Pokhriyal started his career as a teacher in Rashtriya Swayamsevak Sangh-affiliated Saraswati Shishu Mandir. He was first elected to public office in the erstwhile undivided Uttar Pradesh as a member of the Uttar Pradesh Legislative Assembly from Karnaprayag constituency in 1991, defeating a five-time Congress MLA. He was re-elected in 1993 and 1996 from the same constituency. In 1997 he was appointed to the position of Uttaranchal development minister. He was also Uttarakhand's chief minister (from 2009 to 2011) and served as a member of the Lok Sabha's 17th session and the chairman of the Assurance Committee. He is a representative of Haridwar constituency in the Lok Sabha. He was the member of the Legislative Assembly of Uttar Pradesh and Uttarakhand for five consecutive terms from 1991 to 2012. He was first elected for the Karnaprayag ward in 1991 and served for three consecutive terms. In 2014, he resigned from the Doiwala, and was elected for Haridwar in the Lok Sabha. On 30 May 2019, he was sworn in as Minister of Human Resource Development in the 2nd Modi Government. Following the ministry's name change to the Ministry of Education (India) in July 2020, he served under the title of Minister of Education, until being sacked amid a cabinet reshuffle in July 2021.

Literary career 
Pokhriyal has written novels, stories and poems. He has authored 44 books in Hindi, some of which have been translated to English as well as other Indian languages. Most of his books were published by two private publishers – Vani Prakashan and Diamond Books, and many were published between 2009 and 2011, when he was chief minister of Uttarakhand.

One of his works was adapted into the Garhwali film Major Nirala, which was produced by his daughter  Aarushi Nishank and released in 2018.

He is honoured by Hindi Writers Guild, Canada in 2021 and was conferred with the "Sahitya Gaurav Samman".

Books Published 

1) Samarpan; 2) Navankur; 3) Mujhey Vidhata Banna Hai; 4) Desh Hum Jalney Na Dengey; 5) Tum Bhi Mere Saath Chalo; 6) Bas Ek Hi Icha; 7) Bheed Sakshi Hai; 8) Kya Nahi Ho Sakta; 9) Jeevan Path Mein; 10) Matribhoomi Key Liye; 11) Roshni Ki Ek Kiran; 12) Meri Vyatha Meri Katha; 13) Prateeksha; 14) Koi Mushkil Nahin; 15) Kharey Huye Prashan; 16) Ae Vatan Tere Liye; 17) Vipda Jeevit Hai; 18) Pahar Se Uncha; 19) Ek Aur Kahani; 20) Veera; 21) Mere Sankalp; 22) Major Nirala; 23) Nishant; 24) Himalaya Ka Mahakhumbh Nanda Rajajat; 25) Chhut Gaya Parav; 26) Meel Ka Pathar; 27) Tuttey Dayrey; 28) Sangharsh Jari; 29) Saparsh Ganga; 30) Pallavi; 31) Apna Paraya; 32) Safalta Key Achuk Mantra; 33) Mehnat Par Bharosa Karo, Bhagya Par Nahin; 34) Sansar Kayaron Key Liye Nahin; 35) Karmyogi Vivekanand; 36) Shikago Mein Vivekanand; 37) Mahayogi Vivekanand; 38) Antanheen; 39) Ekkis Chuninda Kahaniya; 40) Pratigya; 41) Kedarnath Prlay Ki Sachchi Kahaniyan-1; 42) Mauritius Ki Swarnim Smritiyan; 43) Kritaghan; 44) Bal Kahaniya – Aao Seekhain Kahaniyo Se; 45) Wah Zindagi; 46) Kathayen Paharon Ki; 47) Aao Sikhen Kahaniyon Se; 48) Andhera Ja Raha Hai; 49) Srijan Ke Beej; 50) Bhool Pata Nahin; 51) Bhagonwali; 52) Bhartiya Sanskriti, Sabhyata Evam Parampara; 53) Nepal Mein Ek Din; 54) Khushiyon Ka Desh Bhutan; 55) Sapne Jo Sone Na De; 56) Bhartiya Sanskriti Ka Samvahak Indonesia; 57) Manavata Ke Praneta: Maharshi Arvind; 58) Poorvi Africa Ka Praveshdwar Uganda

References

External links

 * Official biographical sketch in Parliament of India website

|-

People from Pauri Garhwal district
Chief ministers from Bharatiya Janata Party
Chief Ministers of Uttarakhand
Members of the Uttarakhand Legislative Assembly
1959 births
Living people
Uttar Pradesh MLAs 1991–1993
Uttar Pradesh MLAs 1993–1996
Uttar Pradesh MLAs 1997–2002
Uttarakhand MLAs 2007–2012
India MPs 2014–2019
Lok Sabha members from Uttarakhand
Bharatiya Janata Party politicians from Uttarakhand
Uttarakhand politicians
People from Haridwar district
Narendra Modi ministry
Education Ministers of India
India MPs 2019–present
Finance Ministers of Uttarakhand